ES Belfaux  are a football team from  Switzerland who currently play in the 2ème league  2019–2020.

Current squad

Staff and board members

 Trainer: Jacques Descloux
 Assistant trainer: Patrick Sudan

References

External links
Official website

Association football clubs established in 1948
Belfaux,ES
1948 establishments in Switzerland